Below are the squads for the Football at the 1993 Mediterranean Games, hosted in Languedoc-Roussillon, France, and took place between 16 and 27 June 1993. Teams were national U-23 sides.

Group A

Algeria
Head coach:  Mustapha Aksouh

Greece

Bosnia-Herzegovina

Group B

Croatia
Head coach:  Vlatko Marković

France
Head coach:

Tunisia

Turkey
Head coach:  Fatih Terim

Group C

Italy
Head coach:  Cesare Maldini

Morocco
Head coach: Abdelkhalek Louzani

Slovenia
Head coach:

References

External links
 FIGC archive 

Sports at the 1993 Mediterranean Games
Mediterranean Games football squads